Campaign Hexagon System is a book guide published by Judges Guild in 1977 for the Dungeons & Dragons game.

Contents
Campaign Hexagon System is a 1977 book published by Judges Guild for use as an accessory with the Dungeons & Dragons game.

Campaign Hexagon System is a GM's aid: a book of blank hexagon sheets overprinted with larger gray hexes so the GM can integrate wilderness maps of varying scales.  It includes tables for generating wilderness terrain.

Campaign Hexagon System is a booklet of which the main portion is devoted to over 60 blank campaign hex grids.  A rectangular hexagonal tessellation of about 1000 small hexes appears on each page, and on this grid is superimposed a large hex representing 5 miles across flats.  The booklet also contains other guidelines generally relevant to a fantasy wilderness campaign, including Keen Sighting, Hydrographic Terrain (such as rivers and streams), Movement Obstacles, Prospecting (for ore, precious minerals, and the like), Flora Types, Vegetables, and Fauna Classifications.

Publication history
Campaign Hexagon System was written by Bob Bledsaw and Bill Owen, and was published by Judges Guild in 1977 as a 64-page book. A listing of cumulative sales from 1981 shows that Campaign Hexagon System sold over 20,000 units.

Reception
Don Turnbull reviewed Campaign Hexagon System for White Dwarf #6. He commented that "This is a useful booklet of records for those involved in a fantasy 'wilderness' campaign game". Turnbull concluded his review by saying, "Though I am not personally involved in 'outdoor' fantasy gaming at the moment, I should have thought this to be a most valuable source of reference data for player and gamemaster alike."

Patrick Amory reviewed Campaign Hexagon System for Different Worlds magazine and stated that "In the front are useful and extraordinarily detailed charts for determining types of flora and fauna, just which way that stream bends, and the exact depth of that gorge - all with adjustments for latitude. This play-aid will be incomparably useful to all serious GMs."

Shannon Appelcline called the Campaign Hexagon System (1977) a "clever gamemaster aid, this one a set of blank hex maps that gamemasters could use to portray large wilderness areas. It pushed Judges Guild's ideas of large-scale campaigns — something that they alone in the industry were concentrating on at the time — and matched the campaign hexes that they used to depict the lands around their City State."

References

Judges Guild fantasy role-playing game supplements
Role-playing game supplements introduced in 1977